Little Trip is a soundtrack by Mugison, released in 2005, for the movie A Little Trip to Heaven by Baltasar Kormákur.

Track listing
"Pétur Grétarsson" - 0:36
"Go Blind" - 2:52
"Little Trip to Heaven" - 3:44
"Watchdog" - 1:10
"Mugicone" - 1:22
"Piano for Tombstones" - 0:32
"Clip" - 10" - 3:18
"Alone in a Hotel" - 1:40
"Rush" - 3:38
"Pétur Þor Ben" - 5:23
"Watchcat" - 2:24
"My Nobel Prize" - 2:44
"Alone in the Office" - 1:28
"Mugicone Part" - 2" - 2:12
"Stiff" - 1:41
"Sammi & Kjartan" - 2:15
"Unnamed" - 4:26

References

Mugison albums
2005 soundtrack albums
Thriller film soundtracks